Scribblers is an imprint of the Salariya Book Company publishes books designed to develop key learning skills for babies, toddlers and young children. Scribblers was established in 2007 by David Salariya, and currently publishes board books for babies and toddlers plus early-learning and activity books for pre-school children.

History 
The Salariya Book Company was founded as a book-packaging company by David Salariya in Brighton, England, in 1989, and in 2002 started publishing under its imprint Book House. In 2007, Salariya launched its imprint Scribblers a division of Book House, publishing books designed to encourage key developmental skills for babies, toddlers and pre-school children. The You Wouldn't Want To Be series of books is their best-known series world wide.

In March 2009, the US edition of All About Me: A Babies Guide to Babies was named one of the CCBC's (Cooperative Children's Book Centre) choices 2009.

In April 2010 Scribblers will publish the first two titles in its Book, Webcam, Action! series: Tyrone the Clean 'o' Saurus and What Lola Wants... Lola Gets. These books are the first to feature augmented reality technology in a title aimed at young children.

Series 
EyeBaby
Teddy Time
Brighter Baby
Chunkie Hunkies
Dressing Dolls
First...
Spot and Match
Tiara Sticker Books
Touch Feel Flip Flap 
Tough Stuff
Where on Earth?
Words, Numbers
Ring for Rescue

See also 
You Wouldn't Want To Be

References

External links
 Scribblers official website

Book publishing companies of the United Kingdom